HMS Solebay was a member of the standardize 20-gun sixth rates built at the end of the 17th Century. After commissioning she spent her career mainly in the North Sea with a stint in the Irish sea. Mainly employed as a trade protection vessel. She was wrecked in 1709.

Solebay was the first named vessel in the Royal Navy.

Construction
She was ordered in the Second Batch of eight ships to be built under contrat by Edward Snelgrove of Redhouse. She was launched on 13 September 1694.

Commissioned Service
She was commissioned on 13 August 1694 under the command of Captain Robert Stevens, RN for service in the North Sea. Captain Henry Wilde, RN took command on 1 May 1695 for fishery protection in the North Sea. With Captain Henry Lawrence taking command from 25 May 1699 into 1700 she remained in the Irish Sea. Her assignment was changed to the North Sea under the following commanders: 1702 Captain John Alfred, RN; 1706 Commander Galfridus Walpole, RN; 1707 Commander Sir Tancred Robinson, RN; and 1708 Commander George Stidson, RN.

Disposition
HMS Solebay was wrecked on Boston Knock sands, Lincolnshire on 25 December 1709.

Notes

Citations

References
 Winfield, British Warships in the Age of Sail (1603 – 1714), by Rif Winfield, published by Seaforth Publishing, England © 2009, EPUB , Chapter 6, The Sixth Rates, Vessels acquired from 18 December 1688, Sixth Rates of 20 guns and up to 26 guns, Maidstone Group, Solebay
 Colledge, Ships of the Royal Navy, by J.J. Colledge, revised and updated by Lt Cdr Ben Warlow and Steve Bush, published by Seaforth Publishing, Barnsley, Great Britain, © 2020, e  (EPUB), Section S (Solebay)

 

1690s ships
Corvettes of the Royal Navy
Naval ships of the United Kingdom